Don McNeill may refer to:

 Don McNeill (radio presenter) (1907–1996), American radio personality
 Don McNeill (tennis) (1918–1996), American tennis player

See also 
 Donald McNeil Jr. (born 1954), American science and health journalist
 Don McNeal (born 1958), American football player